New Riga Theatre is a theatre in Riga, Latvia. It was established in 1992. Several world known Latvian directors have started their career in this theatre, like  Alvis Hermanis, Viesturs Kairišs among others.

Directors/actors/freelance actors
Directors:
Alvis Hermanis
Māra Ķimele

Actors:
Andris Keišs
Baiba Broka
Elita Kļaviņa
Ģirts Krūmiņš
Guna Zariņa
Gundars Āboliņš
Inga Alsiņa-Lasmane
Inga Tropa
Ivars Krasts
Jana Čivžele
Jevgenijs Isajevs
Kaspars Znotiņš
Kristīne Krūze
Regīna Razuma
Sandra Kļaviņa
Toms Veličko
Vilis Daudziņš

Freelance actor:
Andis Strods
Anta Krūmiņa
Āris Matesovičs
Edgars Samītis
Gatis Gāga
Iveta Pole
Liena Šmukste
Reinis Boters
Varis Piņķis

Repertory 

 THE GOAT or WHO IS SILVIA?
 ASPASIA. PERSONALLY
 BRODSKY/BARYSHNIKOV
 THE LAKE OF HOPES
 CYNICS
 THE TIPSY GOD
 THE TWELVE CHAIRS
 POETRY
 DUKŠI
 OSIERS
 PHILOMEL COTTAGE
 LATVIAN LOVE
 BLACK MILK
 NORA
 OBLOMOV
 THE LATVIAN ROBBERS
 TRAVELLERS BY SEA AND LAND
 SUBMISSION
 LENIN'S LAST CHRISTMAS PARTY
 THE TRIAL
 AUTUMN SONATA
 TEACHER JAAP AND THE CLASS
 SONJA
 GRANDFATHER
 ZIEDONIS AND THE UNIVERSE

References

External links
Official site

Theatres in Riga
1992 establishments in Latvia
Buildings and structures in Riga